Barcelona is an electronica song performed by Swedish band BWO. The song was released as a second single from their first greatest hits album, Pandemonium - The Singles Collection in Sweden, on May 26, 2008.

Track list
Digital Download; CD Single:
 Barcelona (Radio Edit) 3:45
 Barcelona (Shane 54 & Myon Retrofuturism Edit) 3:24
 Barcelona (Soundfactory Radio Edit) 3:40
 Barcelona (Ali Payami Remix) 3:41
 Barcelona (Oscar Holter Body Mix) 4:51
 Barcelona (Shane 54 & Myon Retrofutrism Remix) 5:55
 Barcelona (Soundfactory Reconstruction Anthem) 6:59
 Barcelona (Soundfactory Pumpin' DubBarcelona) 8:01
 Barcelona (Hanssonic Featuring Felix & Märta Remix) 5:58
 Barcelona (Miss Leeloo After Hours Remix) 4:56

References

2008 singles
BWO (band) songs
Songs written by Alexander Bard
Songs written by Martin Rolinski
Songs written by Anders Hansson (songwriter)
2008 songs
Capitol Records singles
EMI Records singles